Stephen Edward Broden (born April 11, 1952) is a former Republican political candidate from the state of Texas in the  for the United States House of Representatives.  He was defeated by Democratic incumbent Eddie Bernice Johnson. Broden is a businessman, political commentator, former professor, and an activist for anti-abortion causes.

Education
Broden graduated from the University of Michigan with a Bachelor of Arts and then a Master of Arts degree in communication, and he later studied at the Dallas Theological Seminary, where he received a Master of Arts in Bible studies.

He served as an adjunct professor at Dallas Baptist University from 1990 to 1992 and spent 10 years in the private sector at Atlantic Richfield Company (ARCO) in human resources. He has been a business owner of several self-serve car wash facilities, and has also worked as a newscaster, disc jockey, and radio broadcaster. Currently he is a co-host on the radio program Life and Liberty for KSKY, 660 AM and is also a radio broadcaster of One-Minute "thought of the day" commentaries on this station.

Career
Broden founded the Fair Park Bible Fellowship Church in 1987 and serves as its senior pastor. He has served as president of the Fair Park Friendship Center for over 18 years and as its executive director for over 11 years. The center provides assistance to the community's "inner-city" families, including a clothing store and back-to-school rally where children from neighborhood families are provided with donated school supplies and family counseling.

Broden advocates in the Fair Park and South Dallas areas for economic opportunity, improved access to education, and against abortion. He is a spokesman for the black anti-abortion movement in Dallas and a contributor to blackprolifemovement.blogspot.com. He is a founder of Ebony Berean, an organization whose mission includes informing African-American Pastors of the "Culture War".

He is a speaker for the Tea Party movement.

Broden has been a recurring political commentator on Fox News Channel, including appearances on the Glenn Beck show.

He was awarded "Champion of the Republican Party" by the NRCC Business Advisory Council Texas and has also received the Ronald Reagan Gold Medal Award. From 1999 to 2002 he served as Republican Precinct Chairman in DeSoto, Texas.

2010 election
On March 2, 2010, Broden won the plurality of votes, in a three-way Republican primary election for the U.S. House in Texas's 30th congressional district, with 46.6%. On April 13, 2010 he won the Republican Primary runoff election, with 67.5% of the votes, and became the 2010 Republican candidate for the November general election.

In October 2010  Broden was accused of saying that the current federal government was "tyrannical" and suggested violent overthrow could not be ruled out if there was not a "change in leadership" resulting from the November elections during an interview with a local Dallas Television Station.

Johnson ended up defeating Broden by a margin of over 54%. Johnson had the largest margin of victory of any Democrat running for the U.S. House in Texas in 2010.

Marlise Muñoz

Broden argued for continuation of artificial life support for the body of Marlise Muñoz and led a vigil outside the Texas hospital where her body was kept on artificial life support. She was 14 weeks pregnant when her husband found her unconscious in November, possibly from a blood clot and subsequently died from brain death.  Prior to her death she had indicated  that she would not like to be kept artificially alive if brain dead.  The fetus had suffered from oxygen deprivation and was suspected to be non-viable. The fetus' lower extremities were deformed to the extent that the gender couldn't be determined. The unborn child also had fluid building up inside the skull (Hydrocephalus) and possibly had a heart problem.  A 2002 study estimated the cost for an ICU bed in an average U.S. hospital is $2,000 to $3,000 per day. An attorney who had helped rewrite the Texas state law being used to keep her body on life support at John Peter Smith Hospital said that there was a problem with the application of the law to a patient that was no longer alive.  Her husband Erick, with the support of her family, successfully petitioned a court to order termination of life support.

Personal life
Broden has lived in the Dallas, Texas area for more than 30 years and is married to Donna W. Broden. They have three children.

References

External links
 Official Site for Broden for Congress

Texas Republicans
Tea Party movement activists
Living people
1952 births
People from Dallas
People from DeSoto, Texas
African-American people in Texas politics
University of Michigan alumni
American anti-abortion activists
Activists from Texas
21st-century African-American politicians
21st-century American politicians
20th-century African-American people